Langå, is a railway town in central Denmark with a population of 2.811 (2022), located in Randers municipality in Region Midtjylland in Jutland. It was the site of the municipal council of the now former Langå municipality, until 1 January 2007. Langå is located by the railroad stretch between Randers and Århus and is the beginning of the railroad stretch towards Viborg and Struer. The motto of Langå is "Alle spor fører til Langå" (All tracks leads to Langå) for its placement between the two railroad tracks.

Gallery

Notable people 
 Rasmussen (born 1985) a Danish singer and actor, represented Denmark in the Eurovision Song Contest 2018 singing "Higher Ground". He lives in Langå with his wife and two children.

References

External links
Official homepage Randers municipality
The Langå Guide

Cities and towns in the Central Denmark Region
Randers Municipality